Burin—St. George's was a federal electoral district in Newfoundland and Labrador, Canada, that was represented in the House of Commons of Canada from 1979 to 2004.

This riding was created in 1976 from parts of Burin—Burgeo, Humber—St. George's—St. Barbe ridings.

It was abolished in 2003 when it was merged into Random—Burin—St. George's.

Members of Parliament

Election results

See also 

 List of Canadian federal electoral districts
 Past Canadian electoral districts

External links 
 Riding history for Burin—St. George's (1976–1996) from Library of Parliament
 Riding history for Burin—St. George's (1996–2003) from Library of Parliament

Former federal electoral districts of Newfoundland and Labrador